John Stanbridge (1463–1510) was an English grammarian and schoolmaster.

He was born in Heyford, Northamptonshire and educated in Winchester College. In 1480 he went to New College, Oxford and stayed until 1486, when he joined the staff of the newly founded Magdalen College School, founded by William Waynflete. Stanbridge became headmaster in 1488, following the death of John Anwykyll.

He is best remembered for the series of educational books which he wrote and edited:

Accidence (c.1505)
Parvulorum institutio (c.1507)
Gradus comparationum together with Sum es fui (c.1509)
Vulgaria (c.1509)
Vocabula (1510)

These works were important as they were among the first in England to incorporate humanist educational principles and standards of Latin with the older style of teaching materials.

References

External links
 John Stanbridge, Early Tudor Teacher and Grammarian of Oxford and Banbury, PDF From "Oxoniensia" - Website of The annual journal of Oxfordshire Architectural and Historical Society (OAHS).

1463 births
1510 deaths
15th-century English people
16th-century English writers
16th-century male writers
Alumni of New College, Oxford
15th-century educators
16th-century English educators
Education writers
Schoolteachers from Northamptonshire
Grammarians from England
People educated at Winchester College